Events in the year 1642 in Spain.

Incumbents
Monarch - Philip IV

Events
March 4 - Siege of São Filipe near Angra do Heroismo in Azores ends with Portuguese victory
March 28 - Catalan Revolt: Battle of Montmeló
June 29-July 3 - Battle of Barcelona
August - The Dutch drive the Spanish out of their colony of Spanish Formosa and regain control.  Sebastián Hurtado de Corcuera, governor of the Philippines, is blamed for the loss of Formosa and eventually tried in court for his actions. 
September 9 - Siege of Perpignan (1642). 500 Spanish survive out of original garrison of 3,000
October 7 - Battle of Lerida (1642)

Deaths
November 5 - Luis de Valdivia, Jesuit missionary (born 1560)

References

 
1640s in Spain